Mohan Marotrao Hambarde is an Indian politician and a member of the 14th Maharashtra Legislative Assembly. He represents Nanded South (Vidhan Sabha constituency) and He belongs to the Indian National Congress.

References

Indian National Congress politicians
Maharashtra MLAs 2019–2024
Living people
Year of birth missing (living people)
Indian National Congress politicians from Maharashtra